Louis Fabian Bachrach Jr. (April 9, 1917 – February 26, 2010) was an American photographer, known for portraits of celebrities, politicians, presidents and other prominent individuals. He was professionally known as Fabian. Bachrach was best known for a portrait of Senator John F. Kennedy, which was later used as his official photograph after he was elected President in 1960.

Bachrach's family, who own Bachrach Studios, has been in the commercial photography business for more than 140 years. Bachrach Studios is believed to be the world's oldest continuously operating photography studio. His paternal grandfather, David Bachrach founded Bachrach Studios in Baltimore, Maryland, in 1868. He had previously photographed Abraham Lincoln during his trip to Gettysburg in 1863 during the U.S. Civil War.

Biography
Louis Fabian Bachrach Jr. was born in Newton, Massachusetts, on April 9, 1917.  His father, Louis Fabian Bachrach, was also a photographer. Bachrach received a bachelor's degree in history from Harvard University in 1939 and joined Bachrach Studios shortly afterwards. Bachrach served as an aerial navigator in the United States Navy in the Pacific during World War II. Bachrach later earned a master's degree in Italian literature from Boston College in 1988, when he was in his 70s.

Bachrach introduced color photography to Bachrach Studios during the 1950s, and switched the studios completely to color images during the 1970s. Some of Bachrach's most famous subjects included presidents Richard Nixon and Ronald Reagan, Jean-Claude Duvalier, Faisal of Saudi Arabia, Indira Gandhi, Jawaharlal Nehru, Jacques Cousteau, Joe DiMaggio, Richard Avedon, Robert Frost, Buckminster Fuller, Ted Kennedy, and Muhammad Ali.

Fabian Bachrach died of pneumonia on February 26, 2010, in Newton, Massachusetts, at the age of 92.

Bibliography
1997 Wizards and Their Wonders: Portraits in Computing, written by Christopher Morgan, a collection of historic and current portrait photographs of figures from the computer industry. ACM Press

References

1917 births
2010 deaths
American portrait photographers
Artists from Newton, Massachusetts
United States Navy personnel of World War II
Harvard College alumni
Morrissey College of Arts & Sciences alumni
Deaths from pneumonia in Massachusetts